Rory MacGregor (born 2 August 1976) is a British actor, who has played a variety of roles on television, generally in the 2000s.

MacGregor was born in London, England.  He trained at Rose Bruford College of Speech and Drama, graduating in 1999.

He is best known as Colin Wells in the BBC television series Spooks, a part he performed from 2002–2006.

References

External links
 Rory MacGregor site
 

1976 births
Living people
Alumni of Rose Bruford College
English male television actors